Frederick Delaney (1906–1985),. On assignment by Archbishop of Detroit Edward Aloysius Mooney in 1948, Father Delaney opened St. Patrick's Parish in White Lake, Michigan and Our Lady of the Lakes Parish and School in Waterford, Michigan.

References

1906 births
1985 deaths
Roman Catholic archbishops of Detroit
20th-century Roman Catholic archbishops in the United States
People from White Lake, Michigan
People from Waterford, Michigan